William Ferguson Parrington (1 November 1889 — 7 May 1980) was an English cricketer who played first-class cricket for Derbyshire in 1926.

Life
Parrington was born in Southwick, Sunderland, County Durham, the son of Matthew William Parrington, a mining engineer, and his wife Marion Ferguson. In 1914, he played one match in the Minor Counties Championship for Durham. Twelve years later in the 1926 season, he made his debut in for Derbyshire in May in a match against Warwickshire. In the second innings of this match, Parrington hit his career-best score of 47. He made occasional good stands among some fairly indifferent scores in the remaining five matches in which he played. Parrington was a right-handed batsman and played 11 innings in 6 first-class matches with an average of 14.80 and a top score of 47. He was a right-arm medium-pace bowler but did not bowl a ball in first-class cricket.

Parrington died in Northallerton at the age of 90. Parrington's brothers, Tom and Henry, both played Minor Counties cricket for Durham between 1901 and 1905.

References

1889 births
1980 deaths
English cricketers
Derbyshire cricketers
Durham cricketers
Cricketers from Sunderland